Andong soju (in some brand names ) is a traditional type of distilled soju produced in Andong, North Gyeongsang Province, South Korea.

Brewing

Andong soju is an alcoholic drink. Today, the rice wine for distilled soju is usually fermented for about 15 days.

The process of making the fermentation starter (nuruk) for Andong soju consists of washing and drying wheat, which is then crushed and mixed with water. After, it is filtered, fermented, mixed with hard-boiled rice, and placed in a jug with water for about 15 days. The aged liquor is then boiled in a sot (cauldron). A soju gori (two-storied distilling appliance with a pipe), and a cooling device are placed on the sot, and flour dough is used to make an air-tight seal. It is spread on the gap between the soju gori and the cooling device so that no steam escapes.

When the aged liquor is heated, it vaporizes, and the vaporized steam is cooled by the cold water in the upper parts of the soju gori. This causes the vaporized alcohol to be condensed and trickle down through the pipe.

Origin

The development of soju in Andong is related to the Yuan Dynasty's movement into the Korean Peninsula during the 13th century. The Yuan Dynasty's supply base was in Andong and was established to prepare for an expedition to Japan.

Andong soju dates back to the Silla dynasty (668–935 AD). The distillation skill was developed by alchemists engaged in trade with Arab tribes. Evidence of relations between the Silla and tribes of the Arabian Peninsula includes warrior statues with nonlocal features and Persian glass found at Goereung (hangul: 괘릉; an ancient tomb of Silla in Gyeongju, Gyeongsangbuk-do). China had been drinking hard liquor since the Tang Dynasty. With the close relationship between Silla and the Tang Dynasty, it can be assumed that strong liquor was used in Korea since the Silla period.

Artisans

The artisans of Andong soju are Joe Ok-wha (hangul: 조옥화; hanja: 趙玉花) and Park Jae-seo (hangul: 박재서). These artisans keep alive the traditional ways of making Andong soju through the Korean government's support for discovering traditional alcoholic beverages since the 1986 Asian Games and 1988 Summer Olympics..

After the Silla period, the skills of making Andong soju were passed down in Andong. Joe Ok-wha made and preserves this Andong soju, so she was designated as "Korean food grand master No.20" on September 18, 2000. Daughter-in-law Bae Kyong-hwa (hangul: 배경화) and son Kim Yeon-park (hangul: 김연박) continue the tradition.

Park Jae-seo is 25th generation of Park Eung-ju (박응주) (who was the known starter of Park of Bannam (hangul: 반남 박씨)), and is carrying on the legacy of Andong soju that has been passed down in his family for 500 years. For preserving this tradition, Park Jae-seo was designated as "Korean food grand master No.6" in July, 1995.

Andong soju is the only specialty to have two Korean food grandmasters because Joe Ok-wha and Park Jae-seo's way of making it and materials are different from each other.

References

Rice drinks
Soju